Labeo filiferus is a species of freshwater fish belonging to the genus Labeo. It was recently found from Pamba River, Kerala, India.

References

filiferus
Fish described in 2017